John Browning (1855–1926) was an American weapon designer.

John Browning may also refer to:

John Browning (died 1416) (c. 1369–1416), MP for Gloucestershire 1397, 1401 and 1414
John Browning (American football) (born 1973), American football player
John Browning (footballer, born 1888) (1888–1964), Scottish footballer (Celtic)
John Browning (footballer, born 1915) (1915–1971), Scottish footballer (Liverpool)
John Browning (pianist) (1933–2003), American pianist
John Browning (scientific instrument maker) (c. 1831–1925), English scientific instrument maker
John Edgar Browning (born 1980), American author and editor
John W. Browning (1842–1904), New York politician

See also
Jonathan Browning (disambiguation)